Dame Barbara Cartland (1901–2000) was a prolific English contemporary and historical romance novelist who published 728 books over 76 years.

Cartland published under several pen names, including her married name Barbara McCorquodale. She also briefly published under the pen name Marcus Belfry, the pseudonym of Polish film and television actor Olek Krupa.

After her death in 2000, 160 unpublished archival manuscripts were published as the Barbara Cartland Pink Collection.  
 
For the 2012 Diamond Jubilee of Queen Elizabeth II Cartland's publishers announced the beginning of The Eternal Collection, which re-releases works monthly. Some of Cartland's novels are re-released under different titles, and novels published under Barbara McCorquodale are re-released as Barbara Cartland.
 
Cartland was a columnist for the newspaper Daily Mirror before writing her first novel Jig-Saw in 1920 at age 19. Her last novel in was published in 1997.

As Barbara Cartland

Novels

Non-fiction

As Barbara McCorquodale

As Marcus Belfrey

References

Bibliographies by writer
Bibliographies of British writers
Romantic fiction bibliographies